James Tinkham Babb (August 23, 1899 – July 21, 1968) was an American librarian and book collector affiliated with Yale University. He was born in Lewiston, Idaho. He attended Phillips Exeter Academy and Yale College. He was a member of the Acorn Club and served as University Librarian from 1945 to 1965. He served as president of the Connecticut Library Association and councilor of the Bibliographical Society of America; he was elected to the American Antiquarian Society in 1946.

The Beinecke Rare Book & Manuscript Library was built and dedicated during Babb's tenure as University Librarian.

He and Margaret Bradley married on December 21, 1925. He had a son and daughter.

Babb died at Yale-New Haven Hospital on July 21, 1968.

References 

"In Memoriam: James Tinkham Babb, 1899-1968" in The Papers of the Bibliographical Society of America, Vol. 63, No. 1 (First Quarter, 1969), pp. 1–3.

External links 

 James T. Babb Correspondence. General Collection, Beinecke Rare Book and Manuscript Library, Yale University.

1899 births
1968 deaths
American librarians
Yale University Library
People from New Haven, Connecticut
Yale College alumni